Little River is a town in Victoria, Australia, approximately  south-west of Melbourne's Central Business District, located within the Cities of Greater Geelong and Wyndham local government areas. Little River recorded a population of 1,353 at the 2021 census.

History

The Little River has headwaters in the nearby Brisbane Ranges. It was also known as the Cocoroc Rivulet, Cocoroc being a locality near the area. Where the road from Melbourne to Geelong crossed Little River, the Travellers Rest Inn was opened there in about 1839.

It had been one of the Port Phillip Association's pastoral runs (the first occupier being James Simpson), and later a large part of the district was included in the Chirnside Estate centred on Werribee. Early on small farmers had the benefit of an  common for grazing.

The Post Office opened on 1 February 1858.

The railway line through the town was opened in 1857, as part of the line to Geelong. The local railway station is served by V/Line passenger services on the Geelong line.

Aboriginal history

In the vicinity of Mount Rothwell, near Little River, a semi-circular arrangement of rocks now known as Wurdi Youang was discovered and in 2011 described by an astrophysicist from the CSIRO as indicating the setting sun at the solstices and equinox.  Although the age is unknown, it could range from 200 to 30,000 years.

Heritage sites

Little River contains a number of heritage listed sites, including:

 19-27 River Street, Little River railway station
 985-995 Little River-Ripley Road, Mount Rothwell Homestead
 Old Melbourne Road, Rothwell Bridge
 795-805 Old Melbourne Road, Travellers' Rest (Rothwell Ruins)

Today

The township has a petrol station and post office, a primary school, a kindergarten, a pub, a bed and breakfast, a park, two playgrounds, a train station, a cricket ground and several churches. Visitors from Melbourne pass through the town on the way to the You Yangs Regional Park and the Mount Rothwell Biodiversity Interpretation Centre.

Australian rock band Little River Band is named after Little River after seeing the name on a road sign on their way to a gig in Geelong. Some scenes for the Australian television series We Can Be Heroes: Finding The Australian of the Year and Angry Boys were filmed at Little River, although it was referred to as the fictional town of 'Dunt'. Little River also featured in the movie Mad Max, with Little River Road being used as the movie's infamous "Highway 9".

Some parts of Little River and surrounding areas were filmed in the Australian television drama series, Blue Heelers. Also, in the nearby You Yangs, the 2003 film, Ned Kelly was shot.

Census populations

See also
 City of Werribee – Parts of Little River were previously within this former local government area.
 Shire of Corio – Parts of Little River were previously within this former local government area.

References

External links
Australian Places site

Towns in Victoria (Australia)
Suburbs of Geelong
Suburbs of the City of Wyndham